The Namu River is a river in Fiordland, New Zealand. It rises north of Mount Namu and flows westward into Open Cove, Te Awa-o-Tū / Thompson Sound.

See also
List of rivers of New Zealand

References

Rivers of Fiordland